Yoo Eun-hae (born 2 October 1962) is a South Korean politician who served as the Minister of Education and ex officio Deputy Prime Minister of South Korea, along with Hong Nam-ki under President Moon Jae-in from October 2018 to 9 May 2022. She is the first woman to serve as a Deputy Prime Minister in South Korea.

Yoo is the longest-serving education minister of the country. She was expected to resign and run for the governor of Gyeonggi Province but decided not to given the pandemic-disrupted education in the country.

While studying at Sungkyunkwan University, she joined pro-democracy movement against authoritarian regime of then-president Chun. She has bachelor's degree in Eastern Philosophy from Sungkyunkwan University and Master's degree in public policy from Ewha Woman's University.

She first met Moon when the then-lawyer helped her family to receive benefits from her father's overwork death. She was the spokesperson of Moon's second presidential campaign in 2017. From 2012 to 2020, Yoo served as the two-term, Democratic member of the National Assembly from Ilsan, Goyang.

Electoral history

References

External links 

Minister of Education

Living people
Education ministers of South Korea
Women government ministers of South Korea
Deputy Prime Ministers of South Korea
1962 births
Sungkyunkwan University alumni
Ewha Womans University alumni
Members of the National Assembly (South Korea)
Minjoo Party of Korea politicians
21st-century South Korean women politicians
21st-century South Korean politicians
Female members of the National Assembly (South Korea)